Pressure washing or power washing is the use of high-pressure water spray to remove loose paint, mold, grime, dust, mud, and dirt from surfaces and objects such as buildings, vehicles and concrete surfaces.  The volume of a mechanical pressure washer is expressed in gallons or liters per minute, often designed into the pump and not variable.  The pressure, expressed in pounds per square inch, pascals, or bar, is designed into the pump but can be varied by adjusting the unloader valve.  Machines that produce pressures from 750 to 30,000 psi (5 to 200 MPa) or more are available.

The terms pressure washing and power washing are used interchangeably in many scenarios, and there is some debate as to whether they are actually different processes.

A pressure washing surface cleaner is a tool consisting of two to four high-pressure jets on a rotating bar that swivels when water is flowing. This action creates a uniformed cleaning pattern that can clean flat surfaces at a rapid rate. 

Hydro-jet cleaning is a more powerful form of power washing, employed to remove buildup and debris in tanks and lines.

Areas of use 
Pressure washing is employed by businesses and homeowners to reduce allergies, minimize hazards, and improve aesthetics.  A pressure washer is used to clean surfaces such as:

 Gutters
 Roofs
 Decks
 Sidewalks
 Patios
 Driveways
 Siding
 Parking lots
Cladding
Windows

Depending upon the surface to be cleaned, higher or lower pressure should be used, as well as the appropriate nozzle.

Nozzles 
Pressure washer nozzles alter the direction of flow and velocity of the water.  Nozzles allow users to reach a greater distance or apply more pressure to a difficult to clean surface, however, they can be dangerous.  Nozzles are color coded for easy identification, with black nozzles covering the widest degree (65°) and red nozzles covering the least (0°).  Great care should be taken when using a 0° nozzle as it can cause injury to both the user and passerby, alongside damage to surfaces.

See also

Washdown

References

Further reading
Steel Structures Painting Council (1995), Surface Preparation and Cleaning of Steel and Other Hard Materials by High- and Ultrahigh-Pressure Water Jetting Prior to Recoating. Pittsburgh, PA. SSPC
U.S. Water Jet Technology Association, Recommended Practices for the Use of Manually Operated High-Pressure Water Jetting Equipment, St. Louis, MO: US Water Jet Technology Association, 1987

Cleaning tools
Cleaning methods